Whitney Rydbeck (born March 13, 1945) is an American actor. Rydbeck has had a prolific career as a TV and film actor, having appeared in over fifty different television and motion picture titles.  Some of his notable TV series performances have been on the shows Scrubs, 7th Heaven, Walt Disney's Wonderful World of Color, Buck Rogers in the 25th Century, Star Trek: The Next Generation, and Far Out Space Nuts.

He has also appeared on the silver screen in Grand Jury, Battle Beyond the Stars, A Very Brady Sequel, Oliver & Company, and Friday the 13th Part VI: Jason Lives.

Partial filmography
Sleeper (1973) – Janus (uncredited)
Grand Jury (1976) – DMV Clerk
Love at First Bite (1979) – Male Commissare
Rocky II (1979) – Sound Man
1941 (1979) – Daffy
The Baltimore Bullet (1980) – Photographer
Battle Beyond the Stars (1980) – Saunders: Dr. Hephaestus' Staff
Friday the 13th Part VI: Jason Lives (1986) – Roy
Oliver & Company (1988) – (voice)
A Very Brady Sequel (1996) – Auctioneer
Striking Resemblance (1997) – Dr. Baxter
Folle d'elle (1998) – Fauvette
Angels with Angles (2005) – Jack Benny

References

1945 births
Living people
American male television actors